Angel City is an album by American jazz saxophonist Roscoe Mitchell which was recorded in 2012 and released on the French RogueArt label. Mitchell wrote the piece for the 2011 Angel City Jazz Festival in Los Angeles.

Reception
The All About Jazz review by John Sharpe states "For those who make the effort Mitchell creates a raft of strange and mesmerizing soundscapes, but the journey may be too daunting for the casual listener."

The Point of Departure review by Michael Rosenstein says "In lesser hands, this could easily devolve into episodic dalliance. But, the three maintain a collective focus throughout."

Track listing
Composition by Roscoe Mitchell
 "Angel City" – 55:12

Personnel
Roscoe Mitchell – sopranino saxophone, bass saxophone, baroque flute, bass recorder, whistles, percussion
James Fei – sopranino saxophone, alto saxophone, baritone saxophone, bb bass clarinet, bb contrabass clarinet, analog electronics
William Winant – orchestra bells, tubular bells, marimba, timpani, bass drum, snare drum, cymbals, cow bells, triangles, woodblocks, gongs, percussion

References

2014 albums
Roscoe Mitchell albums
RogueArt albums